Pulling Power is a regional motoring programme shown only on Central Television (ITV in the Midlands) in 1996. However, it returned in 2005 and was shown on ITV1 on a series trial basis until 2008, and it was also as a filler programme at times. It has also been shown on ITV4. Presenters included Mike Brewer, Edd China, Michele Newman, Mike Rutherford, and Sarah-Jane Mee.

History
The first episode of Pulling Power was broadcast by Central Television on 15 May 1997, with presenters James Allen and Sally Gray along with guests Ken Morley and Gary Rhodes in a 30-minute running time including advertisements. Four series were aired between the debut year, 1997, until five years later on 10 October 2002.

The show was later renewed in 2005 until it was cancelled three years later due to low ratings.

References

Automotive television series
1996 British television series debuts
2008 British television series endings